To the Power of Three (stylised as ...To the Power of Three) is the only album by the British-American progressive rock band 3. Produced by Carl Palmer and Robert Berry, it was released in early 1988 by Geffen Records.

The album contains a version of the Byrds' classic song "Eight Miles High" with altered lyrics. The closing track, "On My Way Home", was dedicated to Tony Stratton-Smith.

To the Power of Three was met with negative reviews and was a commercial failure, having reached just number 97 in the U.S. Billboard 200. Jason Ankeny wrote to AllMusic a one-sentence review in which he opined that "...To the Power of Three fails to recapture the magic of Keith Emerson and Carl Palmer's past collaborations" and gave the album a 2-out-of-5 star rating.

"Talkin' Bout", the only single released from the album, peaked at number 9 in the Mainstream Rock chart.

Track listing

Notes
 Lyrics were revised by Emerson, Berry, and Palmer.

Personnel

3
Keith Emerson – keyboards
Robert Berry – vocals, guitars, bass; production
Carl Palmer – drums; production

Additional musicians
Suzie O'List – backing vocals
Kim Liatt J. Edwards – backing vocals
Lana Williams – backing vocals

Technical personnel
David Thoener – mixing (The Record Plant, New York City) (on "Talkin' Bout", "Lover to Lover", and "You Do or You Don't")
Steve McNeill – engineering (E-Zee Studios, London)
Ian Remmer – engineering (E-Zee Studios, London)
Peter Jones – engineering (West Side Studios, London)
Nick Davis – engineering (West Side Studios, London)
Greg Fulginiti – mastering (Artisan Sound Recorders)
John Kalodner – John Kalodner
The Cream Group, London – art direction
Mike Smallcombe – photography

Charts

Album

References
Notes

Citations

3 (1980s band) albums
1988 debut albums
Geffen Records albums
Pop rock albums by English artists